Meymunak (also Romanized as Meymūnak) is a village in Khandan Rural District, Tarom Sofla District, Qazvin County, Qazvin Province, Iran. At the 2006 census, its population was 15, in 4 families.

References 

Populated places in Qazvin County